Domun is a town in the Western Region of Ghana. The town is north of Domunli on the Atlantic coast of Ghana. Other towns that surround Domun are Domunli, Agufo, Ejan, Dentokrom.

References

Populated places in Jomoro Municipal District